Lokve (Serbian Cyrillic: Локве, Romanian: Locve, Sân-Mihai or Simiai) is a village in Serbia. It is situated in the Alibunar municipality, in the South Banat District, Vojvodina province. The village has a Romanian ethnic majority (90.85%) and a population of 2,002 people (2002 census). The town often seems rather empty since more than half of population of Lokve lives abroad - mainly in USA and Switzerland.  The town has an interesting origin story, there was 3 men and a woman who had sheep, they decided to set up at the ends of the town to protect the sheep. The town grew from there to now what it is today.

Name and Name History
In Serbian, the village is known as Lokve (Локве), in Romanian as Sân-Mihai or Simiai, and in Hungarian as Végszentmihály. The town name was changed from Saint Micheal when the town was invaded by the Nazi military forces during World War II.

Historical population and cemetery 
The Town has two cemeteries, one on each side of the town, and is only used for each side. Every family gets reserved spots on the cemetery.

Notable people
 Lazăr Sfera (1909–1992), Romanian footballer

See also
List of places in Serbia
List of cities, towns and villages in Vojvodina

Sources
Slobodan Ćurčić, Broj stanovnika Vojvodine, Novi Sad, 1996.
Republika Srbija, Republički zavod za statistiku, Popis stanovništva, domaćinstava i stanova u 2002, Stanovništvo 1, Nacionalna ili etnička pripadnost - podaci po naseljima, Beograd, Februar 2003.
Na temeljima gde je prvobitno bilo smešteno naselje pronađeni su praistorijski predmeti i jedan srebrni denar iz doba kralja Domicijana (51 - 96. pre n.e.). U ataru susednog sela Janošik pronađeni su temelji kuće iz doba Rimljana i kraljevski novac. Prilikom iskopa temelja Crkve u Alibunaru pronađen je novac sa amblemom Rima i natpisom Vibius, Tribarianus, Gallus.

References

Notes

External links

Official Website of Lokve

Populated places in South Banat District
Populated places in Serbian Banat
Alibunar
Romanian communities in Serbia